Namam Japikunna Veedu is a Malayalam language Indian television drama airing on Mazhavil Manorama since 26 October 2020 and also streaming on Manorama Max. Senior Television artists Manoj Nair, Lavanya Nair, Sreelatha Namboothiri, Manju Satheesh and Risabawa play the lead roles.

Cast
Swathy Nithyanand as Arathy 
Lavanya Nair as Arundathi
Manoj Nair as Rameshan Nair
Anand Thrissur as Unni Ravi Varma
Prem Jacob as Dr.Midhun Menon
Kavitha Nair / Manju Satheesh as Radha Varma
Surjith Purohit as Sarath
Deepa Jayan / Aiswarya Devi as Nandana
Saniya Babu / Anjali Krishna as Gopika
Sreelatha Namboothiri as Mandhakini
Rizabawa as Jagadeeshwara Varma
Poornima Anand as Sharadendenu
Gayathri as Sethulekshmi
Alif Muhammed as Karthik
Lal Krish as Jithesh
Bhagya as Ardra Varma
Renjusha Menon as Reena
Santhosh Krishna as Santhosh 
Jaseela Parveen as Shreya Iyer
Karthik Prasad as Deepak
Sreekutty

References

2020 Indian television series debuts
Malayalam-language television shows
Mazhavil Manorama original programming